Nex Aviation was a charter airline, based in Galway, Ireland, which began operations on 1 July 2007, using two former Flightline BAe 146-200. The airline mainly flew from Waterford and Galway on behalf of the Irish regional operator, Aer Arann, during the summer months.

Fleet
The Nex Aviation fleet consists of the following aircraft, as of 19 December 2008:

2 BAe 146-200 The airline's two BAe 146-200s are currently flown under Flightline's AOC.

See also
 Transport in Ireland

References

External links

 Official website (Parked)

Defunct airlines of the Republic of Ireland
Airlines established in 2007
Airlines disestablished in 2009
2007 establishments in Ireland